The 1922–23 season was the 48th season of competitive football in England.

Overview
Liverpool retained the First Division title, but halfway through the season their manager David Ashworth left the club to take over at Oldham Athletic, who ended the season relegated.

Honours

Notes = Number in parentheses is the times that club has won that honour. * indicates new record for competition

Football League

First Division

Second Division

Third Division North

Third Division South

Top goalscorers

First Division
Charlie Buchan (Sunderland) – 30 goals

Second Division
Harry Bedford (Blackpool) – 32 goals

Third Division North
George Beel (Chesterfield) and Jimmy Carmichael (Grimsby Town) – 23 goals

Third Division South
Fred Pagnam (Watford) – 30 goals

References